The Xianyang–Tongchuan railway is a railway line in Shaanxi, China.

History
Construction on the line began in April 1939. The railway was completed and opened in December 1941. Due to declining passenger numbers amid competition from road, passenger service on the line was suspended in 1993. In May 2021, electrification of the line began. On 15 September 2021, passenger service was reintroduced on the line.

Route 

References

Railway lines in China
Railway lines opened in 1941